Events from the year 1762 in Russia

Incumbents
 Monarch – Elizabeth (until January 5), Peter III (January 5 – July 9), Catherine II (after July 9)

Events

  
 
  
  
 
 
  

 January 5 – Peter III succeeds Empress Elisabeth of Russia. Peter immediately opens peace negotiations with Prussia.
 May 15 – The Treaty of Saint Petersburg (1762) ends the war between Russia and the Prussia.
 July 9 – Catherine II depose her husband Peter II and becomes empress regnant of Russia.

Births

 
 Elizabeth Divov  (d. 1813)
 Arina Sobakina

Deaths

 Elizabeth of Russia
 Peter III of Russia

References

1762 in Russia
Years of the 18th century in the Russian Empire